Acklam is an area in the Borough of Middlesbrough, North Yorkshire, England. It is believed that the settlement is Anglo-Saxon in origin, the name is Old English for "place at the oak clearings" or "place of oaks".

At the 2011 census, the Acklam Ward had a population of 6,027 while Kader Ward had a population of 5,074. Brookfield Ward (Trimdon Ward since 2015) had a population of 5,712. The three overall wards had a population of 
16,813.

History

Manor of 1068
Acklam was referred to as "Aclun" in the 1086 Domesday Book. A precursor to a civil parish, the 'manor' was eleven gold-taxed ploughlands, they would have been eleven settlements in the area. This manor's area had previously been owned by Earl Siward with the area passed to Hugh Earl of Chester in 1086.

This manor's jurisdiction extended to over 24 plough-lands including Coulby farm, Hemlington, Stainton, Thornton, Maltby and Thornaby. Also listed were the later abandoned Stainsby, Barwick-on-Tees and Cold Ingleby, the latter two part of present Ingleby Barwick.

Overlords (1068 to 1488)
In the Manor area, Robert Malet had a ploughland and the king also had 3 ploughlands, royal lands included in Robert de Brus’ fee-ing. When Malet's son died in a pub, the White Ship, around 1120 meant all lands went to the king.

An agreement between Whitby Abbey and Guisborough Priory, by 1138, mentions the 4 ploughlands in Acklam held by the line of Robert de Bruces. Last in the line of Brus, Robert I of Scotland, in 1279 held a knight's fee of half a ploughland along with three parts of a knight's fee between 1284 and 1285.

Over-lording of Acklam came to Lucy de Marmaduke (née Brus), Lucy de Thweng and, in 1346, to Lucy and John Darcy. Acklam passed down the Darcy line until Sir Richard Strangways, son of Lucy and John's great-great-granddaughter Elizabeth, overlorded until his death in 1488. Thomas Boynton had gained powers as lord and tenant from Richard, upon Richards death overlordship ended.

Lords (1086 to 1460/1)
Hugh son of Norman, Earl Hugh's tenant in 1086, was thought to be succeeded by Alvered, or Alfred, in about 1120. Roger, son of Alvered's grandson, William de Acklam had two daughters. Joan was sole heir after her sister's death:
Joan married Ingram de Boynton. 
Their heir, William de Boynton, in 1284–5 was lord and had been living in Acklam since at least 1256.
Ingram, William's son had become lord by 1303.
Son Walter followed, until 1340, 
Thomas and Katherine 1365
 Sir Thomas Boynton II, succeeded in 1402 
Thomas's son, Henry, was executed three years later for joining the Percy rebellion. 
The manor area was merged with Kirk Leavington, under Roger Thornton and was in his possession in 1428, later reverting to the Boynton line:
William, Henry's second son, is said to have held the area after the death of his brother Thomas.

Land holder (1460/1 to 1637)
In 1460-1 Thomas son of Thomas, also heir of William, died as lord of Acklam. 
From his son Henry, who was dead in 1495, the manor came in direct line to Henry's grandson Matthew, seised at his death in 1540, when he left a son Thomas, aged three. 
Thomas was succeeded in January 1581 or 1582 by his son and heir Francis, lord in 1613 and thought to last until 1617. 
Twenty years later Acklam was sold by his son Sir Matthew Boynton, baronet, to William Hustler.

To the west of the current Acklam area, the then village of Stainsby was deserted by 1757. Today this site amounts to little more than a series of grassy mounds near the A19 road.

Overshadowed

In the late 19th and early 20th centuries, this once tiny village passed from Middlesbrough Rural District to Stokesley Rural District, it incorporated into the county borough of Middlesbrough during the early 20th century.

Geography

Acklam is situated in West Middlesbrough, and encloses smaller estates such as Kader, And Trimdon Avenue Estate. Acklam Road runs directly through Acklam, and just off Acklam Road is Hall Drive.
The previous focus of the parish was the residence of the Hustler family, the Restoration mansion of Acklam Hall,
this is shown in maps of the pre-industrial area—such as the 1714 Lordship of Acklam Plan—in the nearby Dorman Museum in Linthorpe.
The house, formerly a grammar school and Middlesbrough's sole Grade I listed building,
had ceased to be the Acklam Campus of Middlesbrough College by the middle of 2008.

Education
In the Acklam ward is Newham Bridge Primary School. The previous Hall Garth Community Arts College and King's Manor School amalgamated to Oakfields Community College and is presently Outwood Academy Acklam. Trimdon ward schools include Acklam Whin, St Clare's Primary.

Kader ward schools include Kader Academy and Acklam Grange, the latter previously Stainsby Secondary Modern. St. David's Roman Catholic Technology College (Kader ward) amalgamated with the other local Catholic secondary school and is now Trinity Catholic College, in nearby Saltersgill.

Notable people 

 Bob Mortimer – comedian and actor
 Pete Firman – comedian and magician
 Chris Rea – singer songwriter
 Brian Clough – footballer and football manager
 Elizabeth Carling – actress
 Steph McGovern – BBC business reporter
 Andy McDonald – Member of Parliament for Middlesbrough, was born in Acklam
 Alan Hughes MBE – vicar of Berwick and Canon of Newcastle Cathedral

References

External links 
Middlesbrough Council website
Acklam Community Council website
 
 

Villages in North Yorkshire
Places in the Tees Valley
Areas within Middlesbrough